Sheeva Ramanda Peo-Cook (7 November 1976) was the inaugural woman to compete at the Olympics for Nauru when she entered weightlifting at the super heavyweight class in the 2000 Summer Olympics, where she finished 10th.

References

External links
 

1976 births
Living people
Nauruan female weightlifters
Olympic weightlifters of Nauru
Weightlifters at the 2000 Summer Olympics